Ventriculinidae is a family of cyclopoid copepods in the order Cyclopoida. There are at least two genera and three described species in Ventriculinidae.

Genera
These two genera belong to the family Ventriculinidae:
 Heliogabalus Leigh-Sharpe, 1934
 Ventriculina Bassett-Smith, 1903

References

Cyclopoida
Articles created by Qbugbot
Crustacean families